Eadweard is a 2015 Canadian drama film written and directed by Kyle Rideout and written and produced by Josh Epstein. The film, a psychological drama, stars Michael Eklund as photographer Eadweard Muybridge. The film's Canadian premiere was at the Vancouver International Film Festival in Vancouver, British Columbia on October 2, 2015.

The film began shooting around Greater Vancouver in July 2013.

Eadweard stars Michael Eklund, Sara Canning, Torrance Coombs, Christopher Heyerdahl, Jodi Balfour, Charlie Carrick and Jonathon Young.

Aside from screening at various film festivals, the film had a successful theatrical run in several Canadian cities.

Rideout and Epstein, actors, had previously appeared in a stage play depicting Muybridge's life, Studies in Motion — the Hauntings of Eadweard Muybridge.

Plot
A psychological drama centered around world-famous turn-of-the-century photographer, Eadweard Muybridge who photographed nude and deformed subjects, became the godfather of cinema, murdered his wife's lover, and was the last American to receive the justifiable homicide verdict.

Awards and accolades
At the 4th Canadian Screen Awards, Rideout and cowriter Josh Epstein garnered a nomination for Best Adapted Screenplay.

At the 2015 Leo Awards, Eadweard received a leading 15 nominations and won in the following categories:
 Best Production Design (Kyle Rideout), 
 Best Costume Design (Florence Barrett),
 Best Make-Up (Kathy Howatt),
 Best Hairstyling (Darcy Burns), and
 Best Supporting Performance by a Male (Christopher Heyerdahl).

At the 2015 UBCP Awards, Michael Eklund won best actor award for his portrayal of Eadweard, whilst Sara Canning was nominated for best actress.

At the Maui Film Festival, Eadweard won the audience award in the Narrative Independent Feature category.

At the 2015 Nashville Film Festival, Eadweard won the Audience Award in the Narrative Competition category, and also the Special Jury Prize for Cinematography (awarded to Tony Mirza)

At the 2015 FLICKERS: Rhode Island International Film Festival, Eadweard won first prize (i.e. second place) in the Audience Choice Awards, Best Feature category.

At the 2015 Alhambra Film Festival, Michael Eklund won best actor. At the 2015 Cape Cod International Film Festival Eadweard won best picture.

See also
 Eadweard Muybridge, Zoopraxographer

References

External links
 Official Facebook
 

Films shot in British Columbia
Biographical films about photographers
2015 films
Canadian drama films
2015 directorial debut films
English-language Canadian films
2010s Canadian films